Schlemm's canal is a circular lymphatic-like vessel in the eye. It collects aqueous humor from the anterior chamber and delivers it into the episcleral blood vessels. Canaloplasty may be used to widen it.

Structure 
Schlemm's canal is an endothelium-lined tube, resembling that of a lymphatic vessel. On the inside of the canal, nearest to the aqueous humor, it is covered and held open by the trabecular meshwork. This creates outflow resistance against the aqueous humor.

Development
While Schlemm's canal has generally been considered as a vein or a scleral venous sinus, the canal is similar to the lymphatic vasculature. It is never filled with blood in physiological settings as it does not receive arterial blood circulation. Schlemm's canal displays several features of lymphatic endothelium, including the expression of PROX1, VEGFR3, CCL21, FOXC2, but lacked the expression of LYVE1 and PDPN. It develops via a unique mechanism involving the transdifferentiation of venous endothelial cells in the eye into lymphatic-like endothelial cells.

This developmental morphogenesis of the canal is sensitive to the inhibition of lymphangiogenic growth factors. In adults, the administration of the lymphangiogenic growth factor VEGFC enlarged the Schlemm's canal, which was associated with a reduction in intraocular pressure.

In the combined absence of angiopoietin 1 and angiopoietin 2, Schlemm's canal and episcleral lymphatic vasculature completely failed to develop.

Function 
Schlemm's canal collects aqueous humor from the anterior chamber. It delivers it into the episcleral blood vessels via aqueous veins.

Clinical significance

Canaloplasty
Canaloplasty is a procedure to restore the eye’s natural drainage system to provide sustained reduction of intraocular pressure. Microcatheters are used in a simple and minimally invasive procedure. A surgeon will create a tiny incision to gain access to Schlemm's canal. A microcatheter circumnavigates Schlemm's canal around the iris, enlarging the main drainage channel and its smaller collector channels through the injection of a sterile, gel-like material called viscoelastic. The catheter is then removed and a suture is placed within the canal and tightened. By opening Schlemm's canal, the pressure inside the eye is relieved.

Angiopoietin deficiency 
Schlemm's canal and episcleral lymphatic vasculature completely failed to develop in the combined absence of angiopoietin 1 and angiopoietin 2. This causes buphthalmos and glaucoma.

Glaucoma 
Glaucoma may be related to drainage of aqueous humor from the eye. This is mostly related to resistance on the internal surface of Schlemm's canal.

History 
Schlemm's canal is named after Friedrich Schlemm (1795–1858), a German anatomist.

Additional images

See also
Intraocular pressure
Ocular hypertension

References

External links
 
Diagram
Diagram

Human eye anatomy